Carte may refer to:

People
 Alexander Carte (1805–1881), Irish British zoologist
 Anto Carte (1886–1954), Belgian painter
 Helen Carte (1852–1913), Scottish British businesswoman
 Richard Carte (1808–1891), British flute-maker
 Samuel Carte (1652–1740), English antiquarian
 Thomas Carte (1686–1754), English historian
 Omer Carte Qalib (1930–2020), Somalian politician
 Carte Goodwin (born 1974), U.S. politician
 Carte Said (born 1997), Italian soccer player

Other uses

 CARTE Museum (Cartographic Acquisition Research Teaching and Exhibition), Baton Rouge, Louisiana, USA
 Carte network, a French resistance network

See also

 Deidre LaCarte, Canadian dancer
 Julio Lacarte Muró (1918–2016), Uruguayan diplomat
 
 Card (disambiguation)
 Cart (disambiguation)
 Cartes (disambiguation)
 Cartesian (disambiguation)
 Descartes (disambiguation), including des Cartes
 D'Oyly Carte (disambiguation)
 Carte blanche (disambiguation)
 À la carte (disambiguation)